La Puente (Spanish for "The Bridge") is a city in Los Angeles County, California, United States.

History

The original inhabitants of the area now occupied by the city of La Puente were the Tongva lived in a village called Awingna, which linguists translate as "abiding place." The Awingna chief Matheo (who also held sway over several other nearby villages) was baptized at Mission San Gabriel in 1774.

In 1769, the Spanish Portolá expedition became the first Europeans to see inland portions of Alta California. On July 30, the party camped on the east side of the San Gabriel River, in today's unincorporated area of Bassett. Father Juan Crespi wrote in his diary that, the next day, they had to build a bridge (Spanish "puente") to cross the miry San Gabriel River.

With the establishment of Mission San Gabriel, the area encompassing Awingna and what is now the city of La Puente became part of Rancho La Puente, established as a mission outpost and ranch. The rancho was visited by the Jedediah Smith party in November 1826, the first Americans to travel overland to California.

Following secularization of the missions in the 1830s, former mission ranchos passed into private ownership. In 1842, John Rowland and William Workman were granted the  Rancho La Puente. In 1884, the area was named Puente (bridge in Spanish; in old Spanish the noun was often feminine, as opposed to modern Spanish el puente). In Crespi's diary, it's written as "la puente", and that spelling has persisted.

The area was known for its fruit and walnut groves during the 1930s.  The city was even home to the world's largest walnut packing plant.  
A small airport called the 'Skyranch' operated in La Puente from 1944 to 1951 before it was closed and developed for housing.
Today, the city is heavily urbanized, but the area still has some historical landmarks from its founding days nearby, for instance, the Workman and Temple Family Homestead Museum in neighboring City of Industry.

Redevelopment of the business districts in La Puente have been ongoing.  However, the local government has been relatively unsuccessful in its attempts to attract big-box retailers and restaurant chains. La Puente retains many aging 1950s-era strip malls.

Geography
La Puente is located at  (34.032410, -117.955195).

Demographics

2010
The 2010 United States Census reported that La Puente had a population of 39,816. La Puente is 49.4% White (4.6% Non-Hispanic White), 1.4% Black or African American, 1.1% Native American, 8.4% Asian, and 0.1% Pacific Islander. Hispanic or Latino of any race were 33,896 persons (85.1%).

The Census reported that 39,773 people (99.9% of the population) lived in households, 43 (0.1%) lived in non-institutionalized group quarters, and 0 (0%) were institutionalized.

There were 9,451 households, out of which 5,186 (54.9%) had children under the age of 18 living in them, 5,367 (56.8%) were opposite-sex married couples living together, 1,824 (19.3%) had a female householder with no husband present, 930 (9.8%) had a male householder with no wife present.  There were 584 (6.2%) unmarried opposite-sex partnerships, and 65 (0.7%) same-sex married couples or partnerships. 989 households (10.5%) were made up of individuals, and 472 (5.0%) had someone living alone who was 65 years of age or older. The average household size was 4.21.  There were 8,121 families (85.9% of all households); the average family size was 4.34.

The population was spread out, with 11,423 people (28.7%) under the age of 18, 4,640 people (11.7%) aged 18 to 24, 11,468 people (28.8%) aged 25 to 44, 8,619 people (21.6%) aged 45 to 64, and 3,666 people (9.2%) who were 65 years of age or older.  The median age was 31.5 years. For every 100 females, there were 99.7 males.  For every 100 females age 18 and over, there were 97.8 males.

The homeowner vacancy rate was 1.0%; the rental vacancy rate was 3.9%.  24,961 people (62.7% of the population) lived in owner-occupied housing units and 14,812 people (37.2%) lived in rental housing units.

According to the 2010 United States Census, La Puente had a median household income of $53,794, with 14.3% of the population living below the federal poverty line.

2000
As of the census of 2000, there were 41,063 people, 9,461 households, and 8,183 families living in the city.  The population density is 4,542.8/km2 (11,757.3/mi2).  There were 9,660 housing units at an average density of 1,068.7/km2 (2,765.9/mi2).  The racial makeup of the city was 39.11% White, 1.96% African American, 1.28% Native American, 7.16% Asian, 0.17% Pacific Islander, 45.14% from other races, and 5.19% from two or more races.  83.10% of the population were Hispanic or Latino of any race.

There were 9,461 households, out of which 50.0% had children under the age of 18 living with them, 60.4% were married couples living together, 17.9% had a female householder with no husband present, and 13.5% were non-families.  10.1% of all households were someone living alone and 4.4% had someone living alone who was 65 years of age or older.  The average household size was 4.34 and the average family size was 4.48.

The population age distribution was 33.8% under the age of 18, 11.6% from 18 to 24, 31.0% from 25 to 44, 15.9% from 45 to 64, and 7.7% who were 65 years of age or older.  The median age was 28 years.  For every 100 females, there were 100.1 males.  For every 100 females age 18 and over, there were 98.8 males.

The median income for a household in the city was $41,222, and the median income for a family was $41,079.  Males had a median income of $26,381 versus $22,018 for females.  The per capita income for the city was $11,336.  18.9% of the population and 16.3% of families were below the poverty line.  Out of the total people living in poverty, 24.6% were under the age of 18 and 9.3% were 65 or older.

Government

Infrastructure
The Los Angeles County Sheriff's Department operates the Industry Station in the City of Industry, serving La Puente.

The Los Angeles County Department of Health Services operates the Pomona Health Center in Pomona, serving La Puente.

The city is served by Los Angeles County Fire Department Battalion 12's Fire Stations 26 and 43.

Economy
The income per capita of the city of La puente is $16,899, which includes all children and adults. The city's  median household income is $62,709.

Top employers
According to the city's Annual Budget for FY2020–21, the top employers in the city are:

Education
School districts include:
Hacienda La Puente Unified School District
Bassett Unified School District
Rowland Unified School District

Elementary (primary) schools: Lasallette Elementary School, Temple Academy (Closed starting 2021-22), Baldwin Academy, Nelson Elementary School, Sparks Elementary School, California
Elementary School, Sunkist Elementary School, Del Valle Elementary School,  Northam Elementary School

Private (primary) schools: Saint Joseph School, Saint Louis of France, Saint Martha's Catholic School

High (secondary) schools: Bassett High School, La Puente High School, Nogales High School, William Workman High School (in the City of Industry)

Private high schools: Bishop Amat Memorial High School

Notable people
Alfie Agnew mathematician, songwriter and musician
Sutan Amrull make-up artist and performer
Tony Baltazar professional boxer (former resident)
Eric Bieniemy University of Colorado Boulder and NFL running back, attended Bishop Amat HS
Anthony Calvillo record-breaking Canadian Football League quarterback
David Denson first professional baseball player affiliated with an MLB organization to come out as gay
Cecil Fielder former Nogales HS and Detroit Tigers slugger, father of Prince Fielder
Jeff Garcia voice actor and comedian; voice for the character Sheen Estevez in The Adventures of Jimmy Neutron, Boy Genius
Norberto Garrido lineman for the NFL's Carolina Panthers
Pat Haden former USC and NFL quarterback, attended Bishop Amat HS
Dan Haren MLB pitcher, attended Bishop Amat HS
Efren Herrera UCLA and NFL kicker, attended La Puente HS
Padma Lakshmi Indian American author, activist, model, and television host.
Mike Lamb MLB infielder, attended Bishop Amat HS
Billy Laughlin "Froggy" from the Our Gang comedies
Darryll Lewis University of Arizona and NFL cornerback, attended Nogales HS
Steven Luevano professional boxer
Kid Congo Powers musician who has played in bands such as The Cramps, The Gun Club and Nick Cave and the Bad Seeds
Lionel Manuel University of the Pacific and NFL wide receiver, attended Bassett HS
Arturo Marquez composer of orchestra music (former resident)
Crispin Castro Monroy municipal president of Santa Cruz Atizapán
Max Montoya UCLA and NFL offensive lineman, attended La Puente HS
D'Angelo Ross NFL cornerback
William R. Rowland eleventh Los Angeles County Sheriff, major La Puente landowner
 Kelly Seyarto - Firefighter and politician. Former mayor of Murrieta, California. Member of the California State Assembly from the District 67. Born in La Puente. 
John Sciarra UCLA and NFL quarterback, attended Bishop Amat HS
Hilda Solis politician, member of Los Angeles County Board of Supervisors for the First District
Michael Young MLB 7-time All-Star infielder, attended Bishop Amat HS

References

External links

 
 Regional Chamber of Commerce - San Gabriel Valley

 
Chicano and Mexican neighborhoods in California
Cities in Los Angeles County, California
Communities in the San Gabriel Valley
Incorporated cities and towns in California
1956 establishments in California
Populated places established in 1956